Guo Zhijian (born 21 July 1971) is a Chinese news anchor for China Central Television, the main state announcer of China.

Guo is known all over China as an announcer for the 7:00 pm CCTV News program Xinwen Lianbo, which has reach all over China on various networks and internationally, is one of the most watched news programs in the world.

Biography
Guo was born in Xuanhua County, Zhangjiakou, Hebei in July 1971.

He entered Communication University of China in 1992, majoring in Broadcasting, after graduating he was assigned to Beijing Television to be a host.

Guo was transferred to China Central Television in 1998, he hosted Xinwen Lianbo since 2007.

Works

Television
 Xinwen Lianbo

Personal life
Guo has a son, Guo Tianyue.

References

1971 births
People from Zhangjiakou
Communication University of China alumni
Living people
CCTV newsreaders and journalists